"Full Grown Fool" is a song written by Allen Reynolds and Susan Taylor aka Taylor Pie, and recorded by American country music artist Mickey Gilley.  It was released in April 1987 as the only single from the compilation album Back to Basics.  The song reached #16 on the Billboard Hot Country Singles & Tracks chart.

Chart performance

References

1987 singles
1987 songs
Mickey Gilley songs
Songs written by Allen Reynolds
Song recordings produced by Norro Wilson
Epic Records singles